Jarvis Kenrick (13 November 1852 – 29 January 1949) was an English footballer.

Career
Born in Chichester, Sussex, Kenrick scored the first ever goal in the FA Cup, for Clapham Rovers in a 3–0 victory over Upton Park on 11 November 1871. Kenrick scored two goals in the match. He later won the FA Cup three years running with Wanderers, scoring in two consecutive finals; the FA Cup Final 1877, and again the following year, in which he scored twice.

Kenrick joined Wanderers in 1874, making his debut in a 2–1 win against Uxbridge on 14 January 1874. Kenrick scored his first, and only, hat-trick for the club in January 1875 against Harrow Chequers. In late 1875, Kenrick succeed Charles W. Alcock as the secretary as Wanderers. Kenrick scored 20 goals in 51 games for the club, ranking him fourth on the club's all-time record scorers list.

On 18 November 1871, Kenrick played for an England representative side against Scotland after Thomas Hooman dropped out.

Personal life
Kenrick was also a cricketer who played for Beddington Cricket Club. In a fixture against the Reigate Hill he took all 10 wickets in an innings and he made one first-class appearance for Surrey in 1876.

Kenrick was the Honorary Secretary of the Croquet Association from 1904 to 1909.

His sister, Margaret, was married to fellow Wanderers footballer Francis Birley.

He died in Blatchington, Sussex.

Honours
Wanderers
FA Cup: winners 1876, 1877 & 1878

References

1852 births
1949 deaths
Sportspeople from Chichester
English footballers
Wanderers F.C. players
Surrey cricketers
English cricketers
England v Scotland representative footballers (1870–1872)
Clapham Rovers F.C. players
Association football forwards
FA Cup Final players
FA Cup winning managers
People from East Blatchington